Sheikh Rashid bin Ahmad Al Mualla (1876–1922) was the Ruler of Umm Al Quwain from 1904–1922, one of the Trucial States and today one of the seven emirates forming the United Arab Emirates (UAE). He gained influence over the tribes of the interior at the expense of the pre-eminent Trucial Ruler of the time, Sheikh Zayed bin Khalifa Al Nahyan.

Accession 
He acceded on 13 June 1904 following the death of his father, Sheikh Ahmad bin Abdulla Al Mualla. He wrote to the British Political Resident in September of that year, affirming his accession and accepting the treaty obligations entered into by his forebears. Soon after acceding, he married a daughter of the Ruler of Ajman – his Uncle (on his mother's side).

Warring tribes 
Rashid bin Ahmed was an astute politician and embarked on a campaign to enhance his influence among the Bedouin tribes, particularly the powerful Bani Qitab. This led, in 1905, to his involvement in a dispute which had broken out in the Wadi Hatta between the Na'im tribe and the Bani Qitab.

The town of Masfout in the Wadi Hatta was traditionally home to the Na'im, who were originally from Buraimi. They found themselves under threat when the Bani Qitab built a fort at Wadi Hatta and started to harass caravans passing through the pass to and from the Omani Batina coast. Appealing to Sheikh Zayed bin Khalifa Al Nahyan, the most influential of the Trucial Rulers when it came to tribal affairs, and following a meeting of the Trucial Sheikhs in Dubai in April of that year, the Na'im gained Zayed's support. However, Rashid bin Ahmad supported the Bani Qitab and although the Na'im retained Masfout, Rashid gained a role in the affairs of the Bedouin at Zayed's expense.

This ascendancy continued the following year, when the Bani Qitab were in dispute with the Balush of Dhahirah, a tribe loyal both to the Bani Yas of Abu Dhabi and the Al Bu Falasah of Dubai.

The Bani Qitab attacked the Balush at Mazim with a number of lives lost. The Balush appealed to Sheikh Zayed bin Khalifa who took up their cause, however finding himself opposed to Rashid bin Ahmad, who supported the Bani Qitab. A general war was averted by a meeting of the Trucial Sheikhs and those of the interior, held at Khawaneej outside Dubai, in April 1906. The meeting resulted in an agreement whereby responsibility for tribes was assigned to the Rulers, with Rashid bin Ahmad taking responsibility for the Bani Qitab. The Balush went on to accept the blandishments of Muscat when oil companies started prospecting in their dar or district and Dhahirah is today part of Oman.

British interventions 
The dispute with Abu Dhabi smouldered on and, in February 1907, the Political Resident in Bushire, Percy Cox, was drawn into the conflict when the two threatened to clash at the inland dependency of Umm Al Quwain, Falaj Al Ali (today Falaj Al Mualla). HMS Lawrence was moored off Sharjah to reinforce Cox's mediation. Rashid bin Ahmad was delivered up to Cox after a week's negotiations, much the worse for wear after his time in captivity.

As in so many cases in the Trucial States, a relatively small incident boiled into preparations for war when a Somali sailor was killed in Ras Al Khaimah in 1919. The culprits escaped to Umm Al Quwain, where Rashid bin Ahmad gave them refuge. Sheikh Sultan bin Salim Al Qasimi of Ras Al Khaimah sent men to patrol Umm Al Qawain's border in case the men should try and move, and Rashid bin Ahmad sent them instead by sea to vandalise Jazirat Al Hamra, where a number of huts were burned by them. Other rulers aligned behind the two parties and the British Political Resident intervened to avert war. Under pressure from the friends of the murdered sailor and the British alike, Sultan bin Salim eventually paid the diya (blood money) to the sailor's family.

Death 
Sheikh Rashid bin Ahmad Al Mualla died of pneumonia in August 1922, leading to a period of disputed succession of seven years' duration.

References 

1876 births
1922 deaths
Sheikhs of Umm Al Quwain
History of the United Arab Emirates
20th-century Arabs